Televizor ("Television set") is a Soviet/Russian gothic rock/industrial group formed in 1984 in Saint-Petersburg.  is the lead singer and founder of group. They began to perform at the Leningrad Rock Club. They are noted for their strong views against authoritarianism in Russian politics, and have repeatedly denounced the actions of Vladimir Putin in their lyrics. At the time the group first formed, it was one of comparatively few political rock bands in Soviet Union.

Televizor's songs were selected for the Legends of Russian Rock collection.

History
The band got its start in the 1984, in Leningrad, and is considered part of the Leningrad Rock Club. Their 1987 album Otechestvo Illyuziy is among the best albums in the history of Russian rock.

"Your Papa Is a Fascist" is one of their most famous songs.

Mikhail's songs and the Televizor music are influenced by Talking Heads, The Cure, Cocteau Twins, The Beatles, Depeche Mode, The Smiths, philosophers Arthur Schopenhauer and Friedrich Nietzsche, as well as writers: Arkady and Boris Strugatsky, Mikhail Bulgakov and Hermann Hesse. 

On May 13, 2015 they performed the song "Ty prosti nas, Ukraina" at the Atlas nightclub in Kyiv. The song expresses the group's position towards the conflict between Ukraine and Russia, containing criticism of Vladimir Putin and mentioning the Heavenly Hundred.

Discography

Studio albums 
 1985 Шествие рыб
 1987 Отечество иллюзий
 1989 Отчуждение
 1990 Мечта самоубийцы
 1992 Дым-туман
 1995 Двое
 2001 Путь к успеху
 2004 МегаМизантроп
 2005 Отчуждение-2005
 2009 Дежавю
 2016 Ихтиозавр

Live albums 
 1984 II фестиваль Ленинградского рок-клуба
 1985 III фестиваль Ленинградского рок-клуба
 1987 Музыка для мёртвых
 1990 Концерт в Амстердаме
 1994 Живой
 2002 Перекрёсток
 2010 XXV лет в одной лодке

Members 
 Mikhail Borzykin — singing, keyboards, synthesizer, programming
 Sergey Sivickiy — guitar
 Sergey Rusanov — drum kit

References 
https://blog.allo.ua/istoriya-razvitiya-televizorov-ot-sovetskogo-rubin-do-nashih-dnej_2021-09-55/

История телевизора

External links 
 

Musical groups from Saint Petersburg
Russian rock music groups
Soviet rock music groups
Russian gothic rock groups
Musical groups established in 1984